For the 2002 FIFA World Cup qualification, there were two inter-confederation play-offs to determine the final two qualification spots to the 2002 FIFA World Cup. They were won by Ireland and Uruguay. The matches were played between 10 and 25 November 2001. As of 2022, this remains the last time a European team earned a World Cup spot through an intercontinental play-off. From 2006 onwards, the remaining European qualifiers would be determined by continental play-offs.

Format
The four teams from the four confederations (AFC, CONMEBOL, OFC, and UEFA) were drawn into two ties.

The ties themselves were not drawn, but were allocated by FIFA as:
 First round randomly drawn runner-up v Third round (play-off) winner
 Final round winner v Round-robin 5th place

The draw for the order in which the two matches were played was held on 31 August 2001 during the FIFA Congress in Zurich, Switzerland.

In each tie, the two teams played a two-legged home-and-away series. The two winners, decided on aggregate score, qualified for the 2002 FIFA World Cup in South Korea and Japan.

Qualified teams

Matches
The first legs were played on 10 and 20 November 2001, and the second legs were played on 15 and 25 November 2001.

UEFA v AFC

Republic of Ireland won 2–1 on aggregate and qualified for the 2002 FIFA World Cup.

OFC v CONMEBOL

Uruguay won 3–1 on aggregate and qualified for the 2002 FIFA World Cup.

Goalscorers
There were 7 goals scored in 4 matches, for an average of 1.75 goals per match.

2 goals
 Richard Morales

1 goal

 Kevin Muscat
 Yahya Golmohammadi
 Ian Harte
 Robbie Keane
 Darío Silva

References

Play-off